Ang Utol Kong Hoodlum is a Philippine drama series developed for TV5 created by Deo J. Fajardo. It stars JC de Vera and Jasmine Curtis-Smith. It is a remake of the original movie where Robin Padilla played the role of Ben, a hoodlum, and Vina Morales, as Bing. The movie was first released in 1991, then a sequel entitled Miss na Miss Kita: Ang Utol Kong Hoodlum 2 was made the following year. It is produced by Vic Del Rosario Jr., and Manuel V. Pangilinan and it also marks as the first primetime series produced by Viva Television for TV5 after a decade.

Cast

Main cast
JC de Vera as Benjamin "Ben" Maningding
Jasmine Curtis-Smith as Bernadette Grace "Bing" Morrison
Regine Tolentino as Emily Bustillos-Morrison
Ara Mina as Rhea Bustillos
Rainier Castillo as Jaynard
Arci Muñoz as Vanessa
Jay Manalo as Salazar
IC Mendoza as Bruce

Recurring cast
Carlo Aquino as Ethan
Noel Trinidad as Theodorico
Empoy Marquez as Epal
Mariz Ricketts as Salve
Beau Ballinger as Liam
Bella Flores as Granny Britney
Flora Gasser as Momsy Mariah
Dennis Padilla as Tiyo Paeng
Jef Gaitan as Bambi
Ramon Christopher as Ace
Benjie Paras as Franco

Trivia
Dennis Padilla, Flora Gasser and IC Mendoza were also part of the original movie as well as its sequel.

See also
List of programs broadcast by TV5 (Philippines)
List of shows previously aired by TV5

References

External links
 
 

2011 Philippine television series debuts
2011 Philippine television series endings
TV5 (Philippine TV network) drama series
Philippine drama television series
Television series by Viva Television
Filipino-language television shows